The Arctic Race of Norway is an annual multiple stage bicycle race held in northern Norway. The first edition was in 2013, from 8 August to 11 August, and lasted for four days. The organising partners are Amaury Sport Organisation (ASO) and Arctic Race of Norway (AS).

The race is an official UCI-sponsored event, and has been placed as part of the Europe Tour. The first two editions were rated as 2.1 events. From 2015 it was rated as a 2.HC event. The race became part of the new UCI ProSeries in 2020.

Winners

Classifications
As of the 2019 edition, the jerseys worn by the leaders of the individual classifications are:
  Yellow Jersey – Worn by the leader of the general classification.
  Green Jersey – Worn by the leader of the points classification.
  Orange Jersey – Worn by the leader of the climbing classification.
  White Jersey – Worn by the best rider under 23 years of age on the overall classification.
  Yellow number Jersey – Worn by the best team with the best performance in the general classification.
  Red number Jersey – Worn by the leader of the combativity classification.

References

External links
 Official website

 
Cycle races in Norway
UCI Europe Tour races
Recurring sporting events established in 2013
2013 establishments in Norway
Summer events in Norway